The Tour of Limburg is a single-day bicycle road race held annually in and around Stein, in the Dutch region of South Limburg.

Winners

References

External links
 

Cycle races in the Netherlands
Recurring sporting events established in 1948
1948 establishments in the Netherlands
Cycling in Limburg (Netherlands)
Sport in Stein, Limburg
South Limburg (Netherlands)